"Warriors of the Wasteland" is the sixth single from Frankie Goes to Hollywood, released on 10 November 1986. It was taken from the album Liverpool.

Having already referenced literary heavyweights such as Coleridge in "Welcome to the Pleasuredome" and Thomas in "Rage Hard", for "Warriors of the Wasteland" Holly Johnson turned to T. S. Eliot for inspiration. Johnson cited Eliot's The Waste Land poem, the 1981 Mel Gibson film, Mad Max 2, and the 1979 film, The Warriors as inspirations.

Even though it featured 3 different 12" singles, "Warriors of the Wasteland" reached number 19 in the UK Singles Chart (making it the group's first UK hit not to go Top Five), #7 in Germany (for two weeks) and #13 in Switzerland.

Critical reception
On its release, James Brown of Sounds described "Warriors of the Wasteland" as a "predictable piece of rock junk" which he believed showed how Frankie Goes to Hollywood had become "appallingly tame and useless" and "so bloody obviously boring that they have resorted to making competent rock records". Billboard said of it that "art-rock megaproduction waxes critical of society's inequalities."

Track listings
(All discographical information pertains to UK releases only unless noted)

7" ZTT / ZTAS 25
 "Warriors of the Wasteland" (Twelve Wild Disciples Mix Edit) - 3:55
 "Warriors (Of the Wasteland)" - 5:00
The single version (A-side) is a remix by Trevor Horn, recreated digitally using samples and synths. The AA-side is the album version, with the spoken intro to Rage Hard tagged onto the end. The titles were swapped on most overseas releases, thus causing confusion on most fansites.

12" ZTT / 12 ZTAS 25
 "Warriors" (Twelve Wild Disciples Mix) - 9:45
 "Warriors" (instrumental) [unlisted] - 4:50
 "Warriors" (return) - 1:22
 "Warriors" (end) - 3:29

As with many ZTT releases, unlisted tracks have created confusion as to which track has which title. "Warriors" (return) can be taken to be the full 6:12 instrumental track, or just the 1:22 reprise. The 2014 digital reissue labelled both pieces as "Warriors" (return).
"Warriors" (end) began life as an unreleased track called "Pocket Vibrator".
On the sleeve notes to this release, producer Trevor Horn noted: "On Liverpool the members of Frankie Goes to Hollywood played Warriors with their own notoriously fair hands ... This so-called 12" is in fact a total cheat ... No-one played anything, in any orthodox sense. It was all done by computers, very powerful computers ... juggling and organising pre-recorded sounds."

12" ZTT / 12 ZTAX 25
 "Warriors" (Turn of the Knife Mix) - 8:09
 "Warriors" (instrumental) [unlisted] - 4:50
 "Warriors" (return) - 1:22
 "Warriors" (end) - 3:29

12" ZTT / 12 ZTAK 25
"Heavy Mental"
 "Warriors" (attack mix) - 6:30
 "Warriors" (instrumental) [unlisted] - 4:50
 "Warriors" (return) - 1:22
 "Warriors" (end) - 3:29
The "Attack Mix" featured additional guitar parts by Gary Moore. A 7" edited version of this track also exists on white label.

12" Island / 0-96799 United States
 "Warriors of the Wasteland" (Twelve Wild Disciples Mix) - 9:42
 "Warriors of the Wasteland" (Turn of the Knife Mix) - 8:11

CD ZTT / ZCID 25
"Warriors" (Compacted)
 "Warriors" (introduction) - 2:25
 "Warriors" (Twelve Wild Disciples Mix) - 9:45
 "Warriors of the Wasteland" [fewer lyrics] - 5:02
 "Warriors (Of the Wasteland)" - 3:57
 "Warriors" (Monopoly Re-Solution) ['rats in a cage'] - 2:21

The CD is one track without a title list, and the titles above are for convenience of reference, apart from "Warriors" (Twelve Wild Disciples) and "Warriors" (Of the Wasteland).
"Introduction" starts with various vocal sounds, then sped-up samples re-edited, then slowed down samples, moving into what sounds like the Return Mix and some re-edited instrumental bits.
"Twelve Wild Disciples" is the first 12" mix - a reconstructed version with additional keyboards.
"Fewer Lyrics" is the album version with verse lyrics missing.
"Warriors (Of the Wasteland)" sounds similar to Twelve Wild Disciples, but a 7" edit.
"Monopoly Re-Solution" is a stand-alone track.

"Warriors" (Compacted) was rereleased in 2012 on CD Sexmix Disk 2, Track 11.

MC ZTT / CTIS 25
"Warriors (Cassetted)"

 "A Matter of Life and Death" - 0:04
 "Warriors of the Wasteland" [instrumental] - 2:59
 "Warriors (Of the Wasteland)" [7" version] - 3:09
 "Warriors" (Twelve Wild Disciples) [instrumental] - 8:32
 "we're rats" [various noises from 'Introduced'] - 0:43
 "Warriors" [excerpts from 'Return'] - 1:27
 "Warriors" (Monopoly Re-Solution) ['rats in a cage'] - 3:03

As with the CD single, no individual tracks are listed on the sleeve, which simply states "... featuring Warriors (Twelve Wild Disciples Mix) and a phenomenon of megabytes". The latter phrase, which does not specifically refer to any tracks in the cassette, is a ZTT coinage meaning "remix" or "collection of remixes" (i.e. remix album), and as such it was also used as a subtitle for The Art of the 12", a 2011 2-CD release featuring a selection of classic ZTT remixes, two more volumes of which followed in 2012 and 2014.
The opening voiceover and the instrumental version of the Twelve Wild Disciples mix were unique to this cassette, until CTIS25 was finally released on CD in 2011 as part of the Liverpool deluxe edition.

Digital download ZTT
 "Warriors Of The Wasteland" (7" A-side) - 5:02
 "Warriors Of The Wasteland" (Twelve Wild Disciples Mix) - 9:45
 "Warriors Of The Wasteland" (Turn of the Knife Mix) - 8:10
 "Warriors Of The Wasteland" (Attack Mix) - 6:32
 "Warriors Of The Wasteland" (Return) - 6:18
 "Warriors Of The Wasteland" (End) - 3:36
 "Warriors (Of The Wasteland)" (7" B-side) - 3:56
 Track 1 is actually the "fewer lyrics" version.

Chart performance

References

External links
Zang Tuum Tumb and all that - Warriors discography and sleeve images

Frankie Goes to Hollywood songs
1986 singles
Song recordings produced by Stephen Lipson
1986 songs
ZTT Records singles
Songs written by Peter Gill (FGTH drummer)
Songs written by Holly Johnson
Songs written by Mark O'Toole (musician)